Bokaro Thermal railway station is a small railway station in Bokaro district, Jharkhand. Its code is BKRO. It serves Bokaro Thermal city. The station consists of a single platform. The platform is not well sheltered. It lacks many facilities including water and sanitation.

References

Railway stations in Bokaro district
Dhanbad railway division